FinMkt, Inc. is a New York City-based financial technology company originally founded in 2014 as Crowdnetic and rebranding in 2016 to its current iteration, FinMkt. FinMkt then pivoted the technology to build a premier SaaS, multi-lender, omnichannel, customizable point of sale financing platform that launched in the summer of 2020.

Funding 
In November 2017, FinMkt announced it closed a $5.4 million equity round led by venture capital firm ManchesterStory Group with help from Seraph Group, West Loop Ventures, Sun Hung Kai Financial, Perot Jain, Vectr Ventures, and existing investors bringing the total raised funding to $7.3M. The funding round was to grow their "Marketplace Lending Gateway" also known as Lendvious, which has processed billions in consumer loan applications. In August 2019, the company announced that it closed its $5 million Series B preferred equity round led by FINTOP Capital with participation from existing investors.

Partnerships 
Throughout its early years working in the equity crowdfunding industry, FinMkt had notable media partnerships with companies like CNBC, and Thomson Reuters. More recent partnerships include a collaboration with Persistent Systems to provide community banks and credit unions with the technology to compete in point of sale financing. FinMkt is also working with the National Association of Professionally Accredited Contractors (NAPAC) to provide NAPAC's members with a multi-lender point of sale financing platform. In addition, Porch has licensed FinMkt's multi-lender point of sale loan platform for their contractor network.

Accolades 
In 2017, FinMkt was included in CreditDonkey's Best in Finance Technology list. And in November 2020, FinMkt was chosen out of 150 applications to compete in Money20/20's MoneyPitch, sponsored by Mastercard, and won the final round. In 2019, FinMkt's CEO and founder, Luan Cox, was named to NYC Fintech Women's Inspiring Fintech Females 2019 list. The following year, she was one of The Top 25 Women Leaders in Financial Technology of 2020 in the Financial Technology Report. And in 2021, she was named one of the Top 100 Women in Fintech by Fintech Magazine.

References

External links

Financial services companies established in 2011
Companies based in New York (state)
Companies based in New York City
Financial technology companies
Financial technology